Brian "Mad Dog" Juliff (born 5 December 1952) is a Welsh former rugby union and professional rugby league footballer who played in the 1970s and 1980s. In June 2012 Juliff was appointed as the chairman of Wales Rugby League.

Background
Brian Juliff was born in Mountain Ash, Wales.

Playing career

Rugby Union - Wales 'B', Wales President's XV

Rugby League - Wales

Rugby League Challenge Cup Winner - 1987

Rugby League Challenge Cup Runner Up - 1979, 1984

Rugby League Championship Winner - 1986

Rugby League Rugby League Premiership Runner Up - 1986

Rugby League John Player Trophy Winner - 1983

Representative rugby union
Brian Juliff played representative rugby union for Wales 'B', Wales President's XV, East Wales against Argentina scoring 1-try, and against Japan scoring 3-tries, Glamorgan County RFC and Crawshays RFC.

International honours
Brian Juliff won caps for Wales (RL) while at Wakefield Trinity in 1979 against France, and England, in 1980 against France, and England, in 1981 against France, and England, and while at Wigan in 1982 against Australia, and in 1984 against England (playing for 30 minutes with a broken arm).

Championship appearances
Brian Juliff was signed by Halifax from Wigan for £6,000 in September 1985 (based on increases in average earnings, this would be approximately £24,720 in 2014), he played in Halifax's victory in the Championship during the 1985–86 season, finishing one point ahead of Wigan. He played in 23-games in all competitions that season, scoring 4-tries.

Challenge Cup Final appearances
Brian Juliff played , i.e. number 5, in Wakefield Trinity's 3-12 defeat by Widnes in the 1978–79 Challenge Cup Final during the 1978–79 season at Wembley Stadium, London, on Saturday 5 May 1979, in front of a crowd of a crowd of 94,218, played as a second-half  interchange/substitute in Wigan's 6-19 defeat by Widnes in the 1983–84 Challenge Cup Final during the 1983–84 season at Wembley Stadium, London on Saturday 5 May 1984, and played as a second-half  interchange/substitute (replacing  Chris Anderson) in Halifax's 19-18 victory over St. Helens in the 1986–87 Challenge Cup Final during the 1986–87 season at Wembley Stadium, London on Saturday 2 May 1987.

Juliff was the second player ever (and only Welshman) to represent 3 different teams (Wakefield Trinity, Wigan and Halifax) in the Challenge Cup Final at Wembley. After breaking an arm playing for Wales in 1984, Brian returned to play in the Challenge Cup semi-final for Wigan against Hull Kingston Rovers, scoring a crucial try from the Right-.

John Player Trophy Final appearances
Brian Juliff played as an  interchange/substitute (replacing Henderson Gill on 61-minutes) and scored a try on 75-minutes in Wigan's 15-4 victory over Leeds in the 1983 John Player Trophy Final during the 1982–83 season at Elland Road, Leeds on Saturday 22 January 1983.

Club career
Brian Juliff was signed by Wigan from Wakefield Trinity for £25,000 in 1982 (based on increases in average earnings, this would be approximately £110,200 in 2013).

Coaching
Brian was acting head coach in the 42-0 away defeat to Castleford in Jan 1991, stepping up from assistant coach to Allan Agar.

References

External links
Statistics at wigan.rlfans.com
Profile at blackandambers.co.uk
Newport RFC : 1976/7 Season Summary at blackandambers.co.uk
(archived by web.archive.org) 'Hall of Fame' profile at Ponty.net

1952 births
Living people
Castleford Tigers players
Crawshays RFC players
Footballers who switched code
Glamorgan County RFC players
Halifax R.L.F.C. players
Newport RFC players
Place of birth missing (living people)
Pontypridd RFC players
Rochdale Hornets coaches
Rugby league locks
Rugby league players from Mountain Ash, Wales
Rugby league second-rows
Rugby league wingers
Rugby union centres
Rugby union players from Mountain Ash, Wales
Rugby union wings
Wakefield Trinity players
Wales national rugby league team players
Welsh rugby league players
Welsh rugby union players
Widnes Vikings players
Wigan Warriors players